Lucas Ruíz Díaz (born February 19, 1990) is an Argentine football player currently playing for Villa Teresa of the Uruguayan Segunda División Profesional.

External links
  (archive)
 
 
 

1990 births
Living people
Argentine footballers
Argentine expatriate footballers
Association football midfielders
Club Nacional de Football players
Plaza Colonia players
El Tanque Sisley players
Huracán F.C. players
Uruguayan Segunda División players
Uruguayan Primera División players
Expatriate footballers in Uruguay
Argentine expatriate sportspeople in Uruguay
Footballers from Buenos Aires